Antennohyllisia rondoni is a species of beetle in the family Cerambycidae, and the only species in the genus Antennohyllisia. It was described by Breuning in 1963.

References

Agapanthiini
Beetles described in 1963
Endemic fauna of Laos
Monotypic Cerambycidae genera
Taxa named by Stephan von Breuning (entomologist)